Eugene Herbert Clay (October 3, 1881–June 22, 1923) was the mayor of Marietta, Georgia, and one of the ringleaders in the lynching of Leo Frank.

He was born in Marietta, Georgia to Senator Alexander S. Clay and Frances (White) Clay. Clay attended the University of Georgia and the Mercer University, graduating in from the latter with an LL.B. He was a member of the Chi Phi fraternity.  
He served as the mayor of Marietta, Georgia from 1911 to 1912.  He was twice elected Solicitor General of the Blue Ridge Circuit and served on the State Democratic Committee.

In 1915, he helped plan the lynching of Leo Frank, a Jewish-American factory superintendent whose murder conviction and extrajudicial hanging in 1915 by a lynch mob drew attention to questions of antisemitism in the United States.

He married Virginia Hudson of Pocahontas, Virginia on December 27, 1919.  He also had one son, Eugene Herbert Clay, Jr., by a prior marriage.  In the fall of 1920, he was elected to the Georgia Senate.  He was president of the Georgia Senate as of 1922. On June 22, 1923, Clay died suddenly of a heart attack in the Wilmot Hotel at Atlanta, Georgia.

His youngest brother was General Lucius D. Clay a senior officer of the United States Army who was later known for his administration of occupied Germany after World War II.

Notes

1881 births
1923 deaths
Mayors of places in Georgia (U.S. state)
Democratic Party Georgia (U.S. state) state senators
People from Marietta, Georgia
Lynching in the United States
American murderers
American white supremacists
20th-century American politicians
Mercer University alumni
University of Georgia alumni